Nikola Schreng (born 15 July 1982, in Velika Gorica) is a Croatian football goalkeeper, who plays for German amateur side VfR Stockach 09 e.V..

Career
Schreng had a spell at Austrian side UFC St. Jakob im Walde in 2015.

Career statistics

Last updated: 14 December 2009

References

External links
 
 Player profile at mfkkosice.sk 
Profile at 1hnl.net

1982 births
Living people
Sportspeople from Velika Gorica
Association football goalkeepers
Croatian footballers
NK Hrvatski Dragovoljac players
HŠK Posušje players
NK GOŠK Gabela players
FC VSS Košice players
FC Wangen bei Olten players
Croatian Football League players
Premier League of Bosnia and Herzegovina players
Slovak Super Liga players
Croatian expatriate footballers
Expatriate footballers in Bosnia and Herzegovina
Croatian expatriate sportspeople in Bosnia and Herzegovina
Expatriate footballers in Slovakia
Croatian expatriate sportspeople in Slovakia
Expatriate footballers in Switzerland
Croatian expatriate sportspeople in Switzerland
Expatriate footballers in Austria
Croatian expatriate sportspeople in Austria
Expatriate footballers in Germany
Croatian expatriate sportspeople in Germany